The Sabah State Government is an authority governing Sabah, one of Borneo states of Malaysia, based in Kota Kinabalu, the state capital. The state government adheres to and is created by both the Federal Constitution of Malaysia, the supreme law of Malaysia, and the Constitution of the State of Sabah, the supreme law of the State.

The state government has only two branches: executive and legislative. Sabah has no judiciary branch due to the federalisation of court system in Malaysia. Although Sabah has jurisdictions towards Sharia and Native Courts (and their respective laws), both courts are still considered a part of the state executive branch.

Legislative 
The state legislature consists of only a unicameral house called the State Legislative Assembly. All 60 members of the Assembly are elected from single-member districts by universal adult suffrage. The Assembly follows a multi-party system and the governing body is elected through a first-past-the-post system. The State, however, may appoint up to 6 nominated members of the Assembly based on conditions provided by the State Constitution.

The Assembly has a maximum mandate of five years by law. The Yang di-Pertua Negara may dissolve the state legislature at any time and usually does so upon the advice of the Chief Minister.

Executive

Cabinet 
Executive power is vested in the Cabinet led by the Chief Minister. The State Constitution stipulates that the Chief Minister must be a member of the State Legislative Assembly who, in the opinion of the Yang di-Pertua Negeri, commands a majority in the State Legislative Assembly. The Cabinet is chosen among members of the State Legislative Assembly and is responsible to that body. The executive branch of the government consists of the Chief Minister as the head of the government, followed by the various ministers of the Cabinet.

State ministries and agencies 
Since 5 October 2022, Sabah State Government comprises the following ministries, which subsequently divided to following agencies:

Head of government 
The Chief Minister of Sabah (Malay: Ketua Menteri Sabah) is the indirectly elected head of government of Sabah. He is officially appointed by the Yang di-Pertua Negara (Governor), who in His Excellency's judgement is likely to command the confidence of the majority of the members of State Legislative Assembly. He heads the State Cabinet, whose members are appointed by the Yang di-Pertua Negara on the advice of the Chief Minister. The Chief Minister and his Cabinet shall be collectively responsible to State Legislative Assembly. The Chief Minister's Department is the body and ministry in which the Chief Minister exercises its functions and powers.

References

 
Politics of Sabah